Stan Wood was a self-taught fossil hunter who dazzled the academic world with his ability to make significant palaeontological discoveries at scale and is arguably most celebrated for refocusing attention on early Carboniferous palaeobiology as the means to closing Romer's gap.

Life and works
Born Stanley Wood in Edinburgh, 1939, Wood left school aged 14 to work as a dockyard apprentice at Leith Harbour during a period of severe economic hardship, when Leith had acquired the reputation as one of the roughest neighbourhoods in post-war Britain.  Wood could put his hand to many things and served in the Merchant Navy as an engineering officer for a time, before being assigned to work for Brown Brothers, an engineering company.  He was encouraged to consider white-collar work and changed career to sell insurance with the Prudential.

From fossil hunter to palaeontologist
As a boy, Wood had been fascinated by Roman Britain, and was convinced that he could calculate the existence of "missing" Roman forts along the Antonine Wall but it wasn't long before he discovered he could also find "missing" fossil fish from rock strata even closer to home.  At the age of 29, with no training but with a natural enthusiast's eye for detail, Wood spent two years scouring the Wardie coastline for fossils  but with no success.  He made contact with the Royal Scottish Museum and found out that he had been looking at the wrong rock-type.  Lesson learned, Wood started to build his own carefully curated collection of fossil fish.  He trained himself to recognise the signs for the presence of fossil fish at outcrop by visiting localities made famous by nineteenth century fossil hunters.  This paid off with his first significant discovery in 1971 and over the next few years, he amassed a valuable collection, which he sold to the museum, supplementing his income as an insurance salesman.

In 1974, Wood struck out at a new locality when he read that a new opencast coal mine was planned in Fife, convincing the National Coal Board to allow him on site to hunt for fossils.  The following year, he uncovered a rich bone bed at the mine, which contained the first Carboniferous tetrapods to be discovered in the UK for almost 100 years. Wood convinced the contractor to interrupt their work and carefully strip a layer over 600m², bagging more than three tons of bone bed over a few weeks.  The resultant research material included rare discoveries, initiated a string of new Ph.Ds from Newcastle University, which gave Wood the recognition he needed to initiate projects at scale with research funding. Crucially, Wood was able to sell enough of what he found to break from selling insurance and become a full-time fossil hunter.  Fully committed, Wood curated his own specimens by working as a technician in the vertebrate paleontology group of Dr Alec Panchen of Newcastle University, completing a geology degree with the Open University, and securing work on a new site on the Scottish Borders, which created a series of research initiatives published in twelve scholarly papers in 1985.

Local legend
Once Wood had identified fossil-rich strata in a specific locality, he would follow through at scale, inspiring others to participate and research his finds, which attracted funding for new, sometimes ambitious projects to uncover new discoveries.  In 1982, Wood had moved with his family to a housing estate at Bearsden and almost immediately uncovered rare fish remains from a burn running through the estate.  Wood alerted the neighbouring Hunterian Museum and persuaded the local council, the estate residents and local youth groups to join him in a huge muddy dig, which led to the discovery of the metre long Bearsden shark, regarded as the most complete skeleton of a Carboniferous shark ever found.  Wood was awarded the prestigious Worth Prize at the Geological Society of London in 1983, and remains part of the community of Bearsden.  In the same year, Wood became "Stan, Stan the Fossil Man" in a BBC Television documentary about him, receiving the BBC Enterprise Award presented to him by Prince Charles in 1986, and appearing a few years later alongside David Attenborough in the BBC series Lost Worlds, Vanished Lives.

Global impact
 Arguably Wood's greatest single discovery came in 1984, when he opened up an abandoned Victorian quarry in East Kirkton near Bathgate.  The quarry revealed an abundance of fossil marine and terrestrial arthropods, along with examples of several classes of fish and early amphibians.   The most important single discovery was a tetrapod nicknamed "Lizzie", a small lizard-like animal (Westlothiana), which is possibly the oldest known reptile.   Ever mindful of commercial opportunity, in 1986, Wood exhibited his large collection on tour, opened by David Attenborough, entitled "Mr. Wood's Fossils" and hosted by three museums across the UK. The following year, Wood opened a fossil shop in Edinburgh by the same name, which is still trading today.  East Kirkton was subsequently leased by Wood and systematically excavated by a dedicated research team from the Hunterian Museum.  Their combined efforts were presented at a conference of the Royal Society of Edinburgh in 1992 and compiled in twenty-eight papers, considered by the scientific community as a major milestone in the understanding of the evolution of the earliest known community of land animals and plants on the planet.

Legacy
Wood spent the next fifteen years expanding global perceptions of ancient biology and palaeoecology, opening up another old quarry  previously considered to have been "spent", at Mumbie, finding new and unusual Lower Carboniferous arthropods and Devonian fish, reshaping the scientific understanding on the evolution of bony fish.

All of Wood's excavations were Scottish sites, most often within easy reach of where he happened to be living at the time.  Many were rejuvenations of excavations discovered by Victorian fossil hunters, casting new light on the early Carboniferous and its growing importance to our understanding of life on earth.  By far the most important new site of Wood's was the major excavation he undertook in the bed of Whiteadder Water at Willie's hole near Chirnside.  For two years between 2008 and 2009 he recovered an extensive fauna of arthropods, fish and tetrapods, which led to the closing of Romer's Gap, inspiring a new generation of Ph.Ds, this time from Cambridge University. The collection is still being studied and will be for many years to come. In 2009, in recognition of four decades of world enlightenment, Wood received the Marsh Award for palaeontology, particularly for his work in inspiring young palaeontologists at the beginning of their careers.

In 2011, Wood was diagnosed with terminal cancer, which made him determined to close Romer's Gap further.  Confined to a wheelchair, Wood concentrated his efforts in a final surge of enthusiasm focused at end of the Devonian from a new excavation site at Jedburgh and then returning to his collection of raw field-specimens from Mumbie.
"With a will and a determination that astonished his carers, he prepared them all and, to his delight, discovered two new species of bony fish for his efforts"

In a career that spanned more than forty years, Wood registered more than 5,500 specimens, discovered thirty-four new species, eight of them named after him, prompting several multidisciplinary projects, changing the scientific understanding of the history of life on earth. David Attenborough said of him:
‘‘... The fact that they shed light on a part of geological history that hitherto has been almost blank makes Stan Wood’s discoveries of worldwide importance...’’

Six years after his death, a Special Issue of the Earth and Environmental Science Transactions of the Royal Society of Edinburgh was published as a tribute to Wood.  It had been thought that 350 million years ago, life on earth was restricted by low oxygen levels.  Wood's discoveries have revealed this to be false, and that there was indeed a diverse fauna of tetrapods and arthropods living on land at the time.  His excavations at Willie's Hole alone have supplied a wealth of new material that, ten years after his death, continues to provide a focus for much research. His discoveries continue to yield important new material for future generations of scientists to unravel.  Without knowing it, Wood had established Scotland at the centre of Early Carboniferous palaeobiology. In 2022, the Palaeontological Association instituted the ‘’’Stan Wood Award’’’ for projects in vertebrate palaeontology, ideally involving fieldwork and fossil collecting.

External links

References and notes

Notes

1939 births
2012 deaths
Scottish palaeontologists
Scottish ichthyologists